"Cha Cha Sing" (stylized as "cha cha SING") is the 29th single by the Japanese female idol group Berryz Kobo, released in Japan on July 25, 2012.

Background 
The single was released in four versions: Limited Edition A, Limited Edition B, Limited Edition C, and Regular Edition. Each edition has a different cover. All the limited editions were shipped sealed and included a serial-numbered entry card for the lottery to win a ticket to one of the single's launch events. The limited editions A and B included a bonus DVD: Limited Edition A DVD contained the "Cha Cha Sing (Dance Shot Ver.)" music video, Limited Edition B — "Cha Cha Sing (Close-up Berry Kobo Ver.)".

The title track "Cha Cha Sing" is a cover of the song "Row Mah Sing" by popular Thai singer Bird Thongchai, and the first B-side "Loving You Too Much" is also a cover of a song by him, titled "Too Much So Much Very Much". Both were translated into Japanese.  One version of the "Cha Cha Sing" music video depicts a flash mob, which was held in Venus Fort.  "Momochi! Yurushite-nyan Taisō" is Momoko Tsugunaga's first solo song. Prior to the release of the CD single, the music video was distributed exclusively on RecoChoku since July 15. It debuted in the first place in the RecoChoku Video Clip Daily Ranking

Track listing

Charts

DVD single 
The corresponding DVD single (so called Single V) was released a week later, on August 1, 2012.

Bonus 
Sealed into all the limited editions
 Event ticket lottery card with a serial number

References

External links 
 Review by Rolling Stone Japan Edition
  - Hello! Project
  - Up-Front Works
 
 

2012 singles
Japanese-language songs
Berryz Kobo songs
Songs written by Tsunku
Song recordings produced by Tsunku
2012 songs
Piccolo Town singles

Electronic dance music songs
Japanese synth-pop songs
Dance-pop songs